Duchess Quamino (c. 1739 – June 29, 1804) was a formerly enslaved woman who became famous in colonial Rhode Island for her success as an independent caterer. She was known as the "Pastry Queen of Rhode Island," particularly famous for her frosted plum cake.

Early life 
The details of Quamino's early life are unclear. She may have been born in Senegal or Ghana, probably in 1739, though the year 1753 has also been suggested. Quamino identified herself as the daughter of an African prince, the origin of her name "Duchess" (sometimes spelled "Dutchess"), and was known for her royal bearing. She also went by the name Charity, which may have been her original name or a nickname.

She was brought to Rhode Island as a child, on the slave ship Elizabeth. In 1750, she became the property of William and Lucy Channing, a prominent family in Newport, Rhode Island. She worked in their household as a cook and a nanny. Quamino converted to Christianity while working for the Channings, and was an active member of Ezra Stiles' congregation at Second Congregational Church, a white church which the Channings also attended. Most white churches required black attendees to sit in areas concealed by screens, where white attendees could not see them, including the town's Trinity Church, but Quamino was not concealed at Second Congregational. She was known as a pious person.

Marriage 
In 1769, Duchess married John Quamino, who was enslaved by Captain Benjamin Church in Newport. During their marriage, they had a number of children: Charles was born in 1772, Violet in 1776, and Katharine Church in 1779, and they also had a daughter named Cynthia. Three of their daughters died young: one at birth, one at the age of 15, and Violet at the age of 18 in 1792. The couple do not appear to have lived together. Their children lived with Quamino at the Channings' household.

Her husband John won a lottery and bought his freedom in 1773, after which he attended the College of New Jersey (now known as Princeton University) to train as a missionary. During the American Revolutionary War, John left his religious vocation to serve as a privateer, in order to raise the money to buy the freedom of his wife and two daughters. However, he died in August 1779, making Duchess Quamino a widow at the age of 40.

Freedom 
By 1780, Quamino was no longer enslaved. It has been said that the Channings manumitted her, but also that "she convinced [Channing] that the two races should be considered equal — yet he did not free her." Although there is no concrete evidence that she bought her own freedom, it is typically attributed to the success of her business. After being freed, Quamino continued to live with and work for the Channings, now being paid for her labor. Quamino worked as a nanny looking after William Ellery Channing, born in 1780, who would later become a Unitarian preacher. He remembered her fondly in his memoirs and considered her influential in his religious and abolitionist views.

Quamino began her catering business from the Channings' house. She delivered cakes to customers and catered large public events. She became known for her specialty dish, a frosted plum cake. She catered at least once for George Washington. By 1782, Quamino eventually earned enough money to purchase her own home. She lived on School Street as a neighbor of Channing, and used the Channings' large oven for major baking projects. In 1792, Quamino became the first black woman invited to join a black male organization in New England, when she purchased a one-sixth share in the business of the Palls and Biers Society of the African Union. As an entrepreneur, she was a prosperous, respected, and well-connected figure in the community.

Death 
Quamino died on June 29, 1804. A large funeral was held in her honor. She is buried in Newport's Common Burying Ground, in the northern section known as "God’s Little Acre."

William Ellery Channing wrote the inscription for her gravestone: "In memory of Duchess Quamino, a free Black of distinguished excellence; Intelligent, industrious, affectionate, honest, and of exemplary piety; who deceased June 29, 1804, aged 65 years." In 2017, Quamino's gravestone, and that of her daughter Violet, were restored.

References 

1730s births
1804 deaths
American bakers
Colonial American women
People of colonial Rhode Island
Free Negroes
 18th-century African-American women
18th-century American businesswomen
18th-century American businesspeople
18th-century American slaves
Businesspeople from Newport, Rhode Island
Burials at Common Burying Ground and Island Cemetery